"Can You Dig It?" is a 1991 single by English indie rock band the Mock Turtles that was featured on their 1990 album, Turtle Soup. It was originally the B-side to the song "Lay Me Down". It was released on Siren Records in all formats except for one of the seven-inch singles released in Europe where it was released by Virgin Records.

"Can You Dig It?" reached number 18 on the UK Singles Charts and number 12 in Ireland in 1991. In 2003, after the song was used in a 2002 Vodafone advertisement, it was remixed by Fatboy Slim and Simon Thornton and released again. The remix peaked at number 19 in the United Kingdom, number 34 in Ireland, number 40 in Greece and number 96 in the Netherlands.

The single was dedicated to Alan Duffy, noting "shine on you crazy diamond" on the CD single sleeve.

Background
The name of the song came about after the Mock Turtles were asked for a name for a song for the B-side to "Lay Me Down" so that the sleeve art could be produced. Martin Coogan had been watching The Warriors which featured the rallying call, "Can you dig it?". The name came first and then the band went off to write the song.

Remix
Vodafone began to use the song in its UK television advertisements for Vodafone Live! in 2002, raising the song's profile. Fatboy Slim and Simon Thornton remixed the song for a single release by Virgin Records. Issued on 3 March 2003 as a CD and cassette single, the remix peaked at number 19 on the UK Singles Chart. Following the remix's release, Vodafone subsequently started using the remixed version of the song on their adverts thereafter. This remix coincided with the release of Virgin's Can You Dig It?: The Best of The Mock Turtles, to which this new remix was the sole single released to promote it.

Track listings

7-inch and cassette single (1991)
 "Can You Dig It?" – 3:59
 "Lose Yourself" – 3:43

12-inch single (1991)
A1. "Can You Dig It?" (extended mix) – 5:55
B1. "Lose Yourself" – 3:43
B2. "Lay Me Down" (live) – 6:43

UK CD single (1991)
 "Can You Dig It?" – 3:59
 "Can You Dig It?" (extended mix) – 5:55
 "Lose Yourself" – 3:43
 "Lay Me Down" (live) – 6:43

UK and European CD single (2003)
 "Can You Dig It?" (Fatboy Slim and Simon Thornton 2003 remix radio edit) – 3:53
 "Can You Dig It?" (original version) – 4:07
 "Can You Dig It?" (Fatboy Slim and Simon Thornton 2003 remix) – 4:11
 "Can You Dig It?" (Fatboy Slim and Simon Thornton 2003 remix instrumental) – 4:11

Charts

Original version

2003 remix

In popular culture
"Can You Dig It?" is the theme song of SSE Airtricity League Live on RTÉ. In 2012, the song was used by online casino Gala Bingo in an advertisement.

References

1991 singles
1991 songs
2003 singles
Fatboy Slim songs
The Mock Turtles songs
Virgin Records singles